The 1951 Missouri Tigers football team was an American football team that represented the University of Missouri in the Big Seven Conference (Big 7) during the 1951 college football season. The team compiled a 2–8 record (1–5 against Big 7 opponents), finished in a tie for fourth place in the Big 7, and was outscored by all opponents by a combined total of 292 to 169. Don Faurot was the head coach for the 14th of 19 seasons. The team played its home games at Memorial Stadium in Columbia, Missouri.

The team's statistical leaders included Junior Wren with 451 rushing yards and 708 yards of total offense, Tony Scardino with 653 passing yards, Harold Carter with 456 receiving yards, and James Hook with 36 points scored.

Schedule

References

Missouri
Missouri Tigers football seasons
Missouri Tigers football